Below is a list of notable people born in Radoviš, North Macedonia or its surroundings.

  Aco Karamanov
   Sibel Redzep
  Kosta Tsipushev

Radovis
List